"San Diego Lightfoot Sue" is a 1975 fantasy short story by American writer Tom Reamy. It was first published in The Magazine of Fantasy & Science Fiction.

Plot summary

In the early 1960s, a naive teenager from Kansas moves to Los Angeles, where he falls in love with a former prostitute.

Reception
"San Diego Lightfoot Sue" won the 1975 Nebula Award for Best Novelette, and was a finalist for the 1976 Hugo Award for Best Novelette. Publishers Weekly called it "smooth".

The story has been cited as an example of the idea that magic can be dangerous to the wielder if incorrectly performed (when the prostitute casts a spell to rejuvenate herself so that the teenager can see what she looked like when she was his age, she is "consumed by green fire"), and as evidence that Reamy was, if not gay himself, then "remarkably familiar with the gay idiom of the time".

References

External links
"San Diego Lightfoot Sue", at the Internet Speculative Fiction Database

1975 short stories
Works originally published in The Magazine of Fantasy & Science Fiction
Nebula Award for Best Novelette-winning works